Twisted Gun Gap is a gap in the U.S. state of West Virginia.

According to tradition, Twisted Gun Gap was named from an incident when a trapped pioneer twisted his gun to render it useless to the Indians.

References

Landforms of Mingo County, West Virginia
Canyons and gorges of West Virginia